Sivapathasundaram Mageswaran was a Sri Lankan chemist. Primarily associated with the University of Jaffna, he became the inaugural head of the chemistry department in 1975, and later Dean of the university's Faculty of Science.

Biography
Mageswaran was born in Kondavil.

He entered the University of Ceylon and followed the Special Degree course in chemistry, and in the final year he was transferred to the University of Peradeniya. He graduated with honours in 1966.

After working as an assistant lecturer at the University of Peradeniya, he completed his MSc and PhD degrees at the University of Sheffield in the UK. His PhD thesis title was Biogenetic Models for the Formation of Neoflavanoids, Cinnamylphenols and Isoprenoidphenols.

On his return to Sri Lanka, Mageswaran worked at the University of Peradeniya for a few more years before joining the newly-founded University of Jaffna as the inaugural head of the Chemistry Department, responsible for developing the department and its facility at Thirunelveli, Jaffna. He was elected as the dean of the science faculty in 1991 and served as the dean for several years.

He published several papers in scientific journals.

Mageswaran died on 2 February 1998. Since then, memorial lectures have been held annually at the University of Jaffna in his memory.

References

1998 deaths
Academic staff of the University of Jaffna
Academic staff of the University of Ceylon (Peradeniya)
Alumni of Kokkuvil Hindu College
Alumni of the University of Ceylon (Peradeniya)
Alumni of the University of Sheffield
People from Jaffna District
Sri Lankan Tamil academics
Sri Lankan Tamil chemists
Year of birth unknown